Redondela railway station is the main railway station of Redondela in Galicia, Spain. It mainly serves regional and long-distance traffic across different areas in Galicia and northern Spain in general, whereas high-speed traffic is served by the nearby Redondela AV railway station, in the outskirts of town.

Services

References

Railway stations in Galicia (Spain)
Buildings and structures in the Province of Pontevedra